The 2015 Singha Beer Grand Slam of Darts, was the ninth staging of the tournament, organised by the Professional Darts Corporation. The event took take place from 7–15 November 2015 at the Wolverhampton Civic Hall, Wolverhampton, England.

Phil Taylor was the defending champion, having won his sixth Grand Slam title by defeating Dave Chisnall 16–13 in the 2014 final.

The 2015 edition saw several changes in the qualification criteria due to the Grand Slam of Darts being a PDC Order of Merit ranking tournament for the first time. As a result of this, at most 20 places were filled by invitations and the remaining 12 places were open for qualification.

The tournament was won by Michael van Gerwen, who had a tournament average over 100, and with this title won every current PDC major tournament at least once.

Other notable things that happened in the tournament included Dave Chisnall hitting a nine-dart finish against Peter Wright in their group match, and BDO veteran Martin Adams making his first appearance at the event, after declining his invite every year since the tournament's inception in 2007.

Prize money

Qualifying

Qualifying tournaments

PDC main tournaments
Players in italics had already qualified for the event. At most 16 players could qualify through this method, where the position in the list depicts the priority of the qualification.

PDC European Tour
In case the list of qualifiers from the main tournaments produced fewer than 16 players, the field of 16 players was filled from the reserve lists. The first list consisted of the winners from 2015 European Tour events, in which the winners were selected in ProTour Order of Merit position order at the cut-off date.

PDC Players Championships
In case the list of qualifiers from the main tournaments and the European Tour produced fewer than 16 players, the field of 16 players was filled from the reserve lists. The second list consists of the winners from 2015 Players Championship events, in which the winners were selected in ProTour Order of Merit position order at the cut-off date.

PDC qualifier
A further eight places in the Grand Slam of Darts were filled by qualifiers from a PDC qualifier in Coventry on 23 October 2015.

 Mark Webster
 Jonny Clayton
 Mervyn King
 Steve West
 Wayne Jones
 Andy Boulton
 Robbie Green
 Steve Beaton

BDO qualifying tournaments

BDO qualifiers
A further four places in the Grand Slam of Darts were filled by qualifiers from two BDO qualifiers. The first of which was in Hull on 6 October 2015 and was open for all players outside of mainland Europe. The other one was in Europe on 18 October 2015 and was open for all players in mainland Europe.

UK qualifiers
 Larry Butler
 Andy Fordham

European qualifiers
 Mark Oosterhuis
 Michel van der Horst

Pools

Draw

Group stage

All matches first-to-5/best of 9 legs
NB in Brackets: Number = Seeds; BDO = BDO Darts player; Q = Qualifier
NB: P = Played; W = Won; L = Lost; LF = Legs for; LA = Legs against; +/− = Plus/minus record, in relation to legs; Average = 3-dart average; Pts = Points; Q = Qualified for K.O. phase

Group A

7 November

8 November

10 November

Group B

7 November

8 November

10 November

Group C

7 November

8 November

10 November

Group D

7 November

8 November

10 November

Group E

7 November

8 November

9 November

Group F

7 November

8 November

9 November

Group G

7 November

8 November

9 November

Group H

7 November

8 November

9 November

Knockout stage

References

External links
PDC netzone, Schedule, results

2015
Grand Slam
Grand Slam of Darts
Grand Slam of Darts